Linguistics: A Very Short Introduction is a textbook by Peter Hugoe Matthews in which the author provides an introduction to linguistics.

Reception
The book was reviewed by Cheryl Eason and Ute Römer.

See also
Language: Introductory Readings

References

External links 
 Linguistics: A Very Short Introduction
2003 non-fiction books
Linguistics textbooks
Oxford University Press books